Bristol Medical School was originally a medical institution in England which existed from 1833 to 1893. It later became amalgamated with University College, Bristol the predecessor institution to the University of Bristol.

History
It was built in order to give training to those who worked on the wards of Bristol Infirmary (founded 1737), the Clifton Dispensary (founded 1812) and the General Hospital (founded 1832).
In 1873 due to poverty and poor building infrastructure the Medical School sought Association with the Bristol Library Society and the Bristol Institution for the advancement of Science, Literature and the Arts. The Library and the Museum were promoters of the scheme for a College of Science which John Percival and Benjamin Jowett were able to translate into University College, Bristol.

During this time the Medical School was hampered by a political split with the Infirmary Conservative and the General Hospital Liberal which for some time damaged the development of the hospital.

An agreement to affiliate with University College, Bristol was agreed in 1879 and amalgamation finally took place in 1893.

Present-day
As of 2008 the medical school accepts some 216 home students and a further 19 from overseas.

The 5-year MB ChB degree is offered. Students may study an additional year if they opt to do the additional BSc degree jointly with the MB ChB.

References 
Notes

Sources
D. Carleton 1884, A University for Bristol, Bristol University Press.

External links 
University of Bristol Medical School

University of Bristol